Nina G. Gunter (born 1937) is a minister and former general superintendent in the Church of the Nazarene.

She was the first woman elected to the Church of the Nazarene's highest elected office. Gunter was ordained in 1960 on the Joplin, Missouri (USA) District of the Church of the Nazarene by Hugh C Benner.

External links 
 Nina Gunter biography
 Nina Gunter: A Woman Called
 Gunter Receives Citation of Emerita Status
 Gunter Book Released
 Gunter Editor of Leadership Journal
 Gunter Elected 35th General Superintendent
 Gunter Featured in Nashville Newspaper
 Gunter Honored by Trevecca Nazarene University

1937 births
Living people
American Nazarene ministers
Gunter, Nina G.
Trevecca Nazarene University alumni